List of bridges in Tanzania is a partial list of bridges in Tanzania. As of December 2011, the country has 4,880 bridges.

Major bridges

International bridges

Other bridges

References

Tanzania

b
Bridges